The Politics of Qinghai Province in the People's Republic of China are structured in a dual party-government system like all other governing institutions in mainland China.

The Governor of Qinghai is the highest-ranking official in the People's Government of Qinghai. However, in the province's dual party-government governing system, the Governor has less power than the Qinghai Chinese Communist Party (CCP) Provincial Committee Secretary, colloquially termed the "Qinghai Party Chief".

Post-1949 leadership 

Qinghai
Qinghai

Qinghai